Jonathan “Jon” Patterson is a Missouri politician, and currently serves in the Missouri House of Representatives.

Patterson has been serving in the Missouri House of Representatives since 2018. He earned a bachelor's  at the University of Missouri in 2002.

Electoral History

References

21st-century American politicians
Asian conservatism in the United States
Living people
Republican Party members of the Missouri House of Representatives
University of Missouri alumni
Year of birth missing (living people)